Kamil Kamal oglu Bayramov (born 19 January 1972), also known in Russia as Kamil Kamalovich Bayramov, is an Azerbaijani former footballer and current manager. He earned one cap for Azerbaijan, in the team's inaugural match in 1992.

References

External links
 
 
 
 
 

1972 births
Living people
Azerbaijani footballers
Azerbaijan international footballers
Soviet footballers
Azneftyağ Baku FK players
Neftçi PFK players
FC SKA Rostov-on-Don players
Soviet Second League B players
Azerbaijan Premier League players
Russian Amateur Football League players
Beach soccer players
Azerbaijani football managers
FC SKA Rostov-on-Don managers
Association football midfielders
Association football forwards